Insadong Scandal is a 2009 South Korean film about a cold-hearted mogul who hires a group of art restoration experts to steal a Joseon dynasty masterpiece.

Plot
A fabled painting from a royal palace is discovered after 400 years. Once properly restored, it could fetch at least $40 million in the international auction market. Bae is the owner of the gallery which possesses the painting. She commissions Lee, a restoration artist, to unveil the painting's true form and purpose.

Cast
Kim Rae-won ...  Lee Kang-jun
Uhm Jung-hwa ... Bae Tae-jin
Im Ha-ryong ... Madam Kwon
Hong Soo-hyun ... Choi Ha-kyeong
Kim Jung-tae ... Jang Seok-jin
Kim Byeong-ok ... Officer Kang
Ma Dong-seok ... Sang-baek
Oh Jung-se ... Keun-bok
Ko Chang-seok ... Forgery factory president

References

External links
  
 
 
 

2009 films
South Korean crime thriller films
Films directed by Park Hee-gon
2000s crime thriller films
2000s South Korean films